Tomás Gonzalo Fonzi (born 24 August 1981) is an Argentine actor.

Biography
He grew up in Adrogué, Partido de Almirante Brown, Buenos Aires. He studied acting with Raúl Serrano from 1997 to 1999.

Career
He started acting in the youth soap opera Verano del '98, of Telefe, playing Benjamín Vázquez, until the year 2000. Then worked on Ilusiones, performed work on Radio, as Los Esparos del Ñorse and also launched as singer with Alfredo Alcón. In 2000 he was part of the cast of La tempestad in theater. Una noche con Sabrina Love, Alejandro Agresti, was his first feature film, in which he plays a teenager who wins a raffle to spend a night with the porn star of the moment, Sabrina Love, played by the actress Cecilia Roth. In 2002 he acted in the soap opera Franco Buenaventura, el profe and the following year he was one of the protagonists of the telecomedy Costumbres argentinas. In cinema he co-starred with Ricardo Darín and Cecilia Roth the film Kamchatka. He was part of Los Roldan, in his first season in 2004, then he starred in the second season of Mosca & Smith with Fabián Vena and participated in the mini series Soy tu fan. In 2006 he stars alongside Gerardo Romano, Carolina Papaleo and Marcela Kloosterboer Doble venganza, for which he was nominated for a Martín Fierro Award. He participated in the second Season of Mujeres asesinas next to Romina Ricci in the chapter Cecilia, hermana. Between 2009 and 2010 he played Adrián "Anguila" Muñiz in Botineras and starred in the movie Paco for which he won the award for Best Actor of Festival Iberoamericano de Lérida and was nominated for Silver Condor Award as Actor Revelation in Cinema. Subsequently he was in two of the highest grossing films of Argentina in recent times and recently began his international career in the Spanish youth comedy Slam. Mexico met him from the hand of also actor, director and producer Santiago Ferrón. Where he made a tour with his rock band Mono Tremendo, having the greatest expected success and gaining recognition and love from the Mexican capital. He made special participations in 2011 in the fictions Un año para recordar, Los únicos and in Contra las cuerdas. In 2012 he participated in telecomedy Graduados. In 2013 he participated in the Unitarians Historia clínica and Historias de diván. Then he integrated the casts of the daily strips Taxxi, amores cruzados and Somos familia. In 2014 he stars in the play Un día Nico se fue with Marco Antonio Caponi being his debut in the musical comedy. In 2015 he returns to Pol-ka playing Máximo Ortiz, the villain of Esperanza mía, starring Lali Espósito and Mariano Martínez on the screen of Canal 13.

Personal life
Since 2004 he is in a relationship with Leticia Lombardi, with whom he has a daughter named Violeta who was born on July 13, 2010. In November 2015 they announced that they were waiting for their second child, who was born on January 13, 2016, at the Sanatorium of the Trinity and whom they called Teo Domingo. They got married in February 2022.

Filmography

Television

Movies

Theater

Television Programs

Awards and nominations

References

External links
 
 

1981 births
Argentine male film actors
Living people
People from Buenos Aires